Eliza Griswold (born February 9, 1973) is a Pulitzer Prize-winning American journalist and poet. Griswold is currently a contributing writer to The New Yorker and a Distinguished Writer in Residence at New York University. She is the author of Amity and Prosperity: One Family and the Fracturing of America, a 2018 New York Times Notable Book and a Times Critics’ Pick, for which she won the Pulitzer Prize for general nonfiction and the Ridenhour Book Prize in 2019. Griswold was a fellow at the New America Foundation from 2008 to 2010 and won a 2010 Rome Prize from the American Academy of Arts and Letters.
She is a former Nieman Fellow, a current Berggruen Fellow at Harvard Divinity School, and has been published in The New Yorker, Harper's Magazine, and the New York Times Magazine.

Professional life
Eliza Griswold graduated from Princeton University in 1995 and studied creative writing at Johns Hopkins University. Prior to post-secondary education, she graduated from St. Paul’s School in Concord, New Hampshire.

Griswold has written extensively on the "war on terror". She won the first Robert I. Friedman Prize in Investigative Journalism in 2004, for "In the Hiding Zone", about Pakistan's Waziristan Agency. She worked with Pakistani journalist Hayatullah Khan, who acted as her handler.

Griswold published Wideawake Field, a book of poetry, on May 17, 2007.
A second book, The Tenth Parallel: Dispatches from the Fault Line Between Christianity and Islam, is a travelogue about the regions of the world along the line of latitude where Christianity and Islam clash. In 2011 Griswold was awarded the J. Anthony Lukas Book Prize for The Tenth Parallel. She was also a 2012 Guggenheim Fellow.

In 2011 in The New York Times Magazine, Griswold published an investigative report, "The Fracturing of Pennsylvania", which investigated the environmentally-questionable practices of fracking companies such as Range Resources, based in Texas. In 2015 for The New York Times Magazine, she wrote about the demise of Christianity in the Mideast.

Griswold was a 2014 Ferris Professor at Princeton University and currently teaches at the Arthur L. Carter Journalism Institute at New York University as a Distinguished Writer in Residence.

In 2015, Griswold's translation from the Pashto of I Am the Beggar of the World: Landays from Contemporary Afghanistan won the PEN Award for Poetry in Translation.

Griswold won the 2019 Pulitzer Prize for General Nonfiction for her book Amity and Prosperity: One Family and the Fracturing of America.

In 2020, Griswold published her second book of poetry, If Men, Then, which appeared in The New Yorker and Granta, was profiled by the Poetry Foundation, was listed as New and Noteworthy by The New York Times and was one of Vogue'''s most anticipated books of 2020.

Family
Eliza Griswold is the daughter of Phoebe and Frank Griswold, the 25th Presiding Bishop of The Episcopal Church.  She is married to journalist and academic Steve Coll.  Steve Coll is the dean of the Graduate School of Journalism at Columbia University, which hosts the prizes, and a Pulitzer board member since 2012. She was previously married to Christopher Allen.

Bibliography

Books
 
 
 
 
 If Men, Then''. Farrar, Strous and Giroux. 2020.

Essays and reporting
 
 
 
 
 
 
Eliza Griswold  (July 22, 2015). "Is This the End of Christianity in the Middle East?" New York Times Magazine
Eliza Griswold (January 20, 2016). "Why is it So Difficult for Syrian Refugees to Get Into the U.S.?" New York Times Magazine
 
Eliza Griswold  (March 5, 2018). "The Violent Toll of Hindu Nationalism in India" New Yorker
 Eliza Griswold (February 2, 2020). “Richard Rohr Reorders the Universe” New Yorker
 
 Eliza Griswold (October 19, 2019). “Teaching Democrats to Speak Evangelical” New Yorker

Notes

External links

"Postcards from Karachi - A Documentary with Guernica: A Magazine of Art and Politics"
Griswold profile at the New America Foundation
Smithsonian interview of Griswold
Video interview/discussion with Griswold by Robert Wright on Bloggingheads.tv
Macmillan Speakers Bureau profile

1973 births
Living people
21st-century American poets
21st-century American women writers
American women journalists
American women poets
Nieman Fellows
Princeton University alumni
The New Yorker people
21st-century American non-fiction writers
Pulitzer Prize for General Non-Fiction winners